This is a list of episodes for Season 16 of Fast N' Loud.

References 

2020 American television seasons